Dawn of the Croods is an American 2D-animated television series that is produced by DreamWorks Animation. The series is based on the 2013 animated film The Croods, taking place before the events of the film. It premiered on December 24, 2015, on Netflix. The second season premiered on August 26, 2016, third season on April 7, 2017, and fourth and final season on July 7, 2017. Sam Riegel was the voice director for the first two seasons, and Brendan Hay replaced him for the last two. It also aired on Family Channel and  Family Chrgd in Canada.

Plot
The adventures of the series takes place before the film, with Eep and the family having new friends, and facing off against new enemy creatures.

Cast
 Dan Milano as Grug, Bud, Womp
 Cree Summer as Ugga, Pat, Clip, Pup Howler
 Stephanie Lemelin as Eep
 A. J. Locascio as Thunk, Baitsy, Steve
 Grey Griffin as Sandy, Lerk
 Laraine Newman as Gran, One-Eyed Amber Mosh, Pram

Additional voices
 Dee Bradley Baker as Bulk, Squawk, Bearowl, Creatures, Moler Bear, Mow, Earl, Old Man Root, Yelp
 Dominic Catrambone as Sulk, Kevin, Fan, Night Mare, Ow the Dentist, Cave Teen, Bag, Guy
 Jim Cummings as Little Mantrap
 Ana Gasteyer as Meep Boor
 Thomas Lennon as Crud, Munk
 Chris Parnell as Snoot Boor
Chris Sanders as Belt the Sloth

Episodes

On July 9, 2017, executive producer Hay replied on Twitter to a question about whether fourth season would be the last season, saying that it "most likely" would be.

Production
In contrast to the computer-animated film, the series is 2D-animated. The series' creators wanted to make it more "cartoonish", but found doing "squash and stretch" in CG too expensive for television. Different animation technique also helped the series to stand out from the feature film, which was concurrently shown on Netflix. The first three episodes were animated in Toon Boom Harmony by Vancouver's Bardel Entertainment. DreamWorks soon found that Harmony was not the best fit for animating scenes that contained multiple characters at once. The rest of the episodes were traditionally hand-drawn by South Korean studios: EMation, NE4U, and Dong Woo Animation.

Awards and nominations

References

External links
  at Netflix
  at DreamWorks TV
 

2010s American animated television series
2015 American television series debuts
2017 American television series endings
American children's animated adventure television series
American children's animated comedy television series
American children's animated fantasy television series
American prequel television series
Netflix children's programming
English-language Netflix original programming
Television series by DreamWorks Animation
Television series by Universal Television
Animated television shows based on films
Animated television series about children
Animated television series about families
Television series set in prehistory
The Croods (franchise)